Sacred Heart of Jesus Catholic School (SHJCS) is a private Catholic school located in Santa Mesa, Manila, beside this is the Sacred Heart of Jesus Parish. The school's name is named after their parish patron, Sacred Heart of Jesus. The school was formerly known as Sta. Mesa Parochial School. The director of the school is the Rev. Fr. Marion C. Munda and the principal is Dr. Henry A. Davalos.

Roman Catholic Archdiocese of Manila Educational System
Catholic elementary schools in Manila
Catholic secondary schools in Manila
Education in Santa Mesa
Educational institutions established in 1947
1947 establishments in the Philippines